Libero Marchini (31 October 1914 – 1 November 2003) was an Italian footballer who played as a midfielder, and who competed in the 1936 Summer Olympics. He was a member of the Italian team, which won the gold medal in the football tournament.

Honours

Club
Genoa
Serie B: 1934–35
Lucchese
Serie B: 1935–36

International 
Italy
Olympic Gold Medal: 1936

References

External links

Profile at Enciclopediadelcalcio.it
profile

1914 births
2003 deaths
Italian footballers
Footballers at the 1936 Summer Olympics
Olympic footballers of Italy
Olympic gold medalists for Italy
Italy international footballers
Olympic medalists in football
Serie A players
Serie B players
Carrarese Calcio players
ACF Fiorentina players
Genoa C.F.C. players
S.S.D. Lucchese 1905 players
S.S. Lazio players
Torino F.C. players
Medalists at the 1936 Summer Olympics
Association football midfielders